C. V. Kunhiraman (1871 – 1949) was an Indian social reformer, journalist and the founder of Kerala Kaumudi daily. A follower of Sree Narayana Guru, Kunhiraman was the author of a number of books covering the genres of novels, short story, poetry, biographies and essays. He was one of the leaders involved in the Vaikom Satyagraha of Reformation movement in Kerala which led to the Temple Entry Proclamation.

Biography 
Kunhiraman was born on February 6, 1871, at Mayyanad in Kollam district of the south Indian state of Kerala to Njarakkal Vasudevan, an astrologer and magician, and Kallumpurathu Kunjichali. After early education at Mayyanad L. M. S. School, he joined the Government High School, Kollam but had to discontinue studies after 8th standard and started his career at the Forest department in 1893 as a clerk during which time he resumed his studies to pass the teachers' examination to become a teacher in 1894 at Vellamanal School, Mayyanad. He taught at a number of schools at Kollam, Kadakkavoor, Kayikkara and Paravur before returning to Vellamanal school by which time he had passed the lawyers' examination and resigned from the school in 1913 to take up the career of a lawyer by practicing at the Magistrate Court at Paravur. In between, he founded Kerala Kaumudi daily in 1911 and later, he shifted his base to Kollam, after quitting his career as a lawyer, resuscitated Kerala Kaumudi daily in 1920 with the assistance of his son, K. Sukumaran. His early journalistic articles were published in Sujananadini, run by Paravoor Kesavan Asan , where he became a sub-editor in due course and wrote poems and articles, mostly on social affairs.

Kunhiraman was married to Kunjikkavu and the couple had two sons, K. Sukumaran and K.Damodaran and a daughter, Vasanthi, who was married to C. Kesavan, former chief minister of Travancore-Cochin. He died on April 10, 1949, at the age of 78.

Legacy

Kerala Kaumudi
To launch a newspaper of his own was his all time-dream. In 1911, C.V. launched Kerala Kaumudi as a weekly newspaper. He was the proprietor - editor, printer, publisher and even the proofreader! Started in 1911, in Mayyanad, it had grown over the years as one of the most influential dailies in Malayalam with 9 editions from Thiruvananthapuram, Kollam, Alappuzha, Pathanamthitta, Kottayam, Kochi, Thrissur, Kozhikode and Kannur.

Other journalistic contributions 
Kunhiraman was also the editor of Malayalarajyam, Navajeevan, Kathamalika, Yukthivadi, Navasakthi and Vivekodayam. He had the rare distinction in Malayalam journalism being the founder of Kerala Kaumudi and founder editor of Malayalarajyam. He had been on the editorial board of Malayalarajyam, Navajeevan, Navasakthi, Malayala Manorama, Bhashaposhini, Kathamalika, Vivekodayam and Yuktivadi.

Literary contributions 
Kunhiraman's oeuvre comprises 14 books, covering the genres of novel, short story, poetry, biography and other works including the condensed versions of Mahabharata and Ramayana, of which Valmiki Ramayanam, a prose rendering of the epic, was his first work to come out in print, in 1901, followed by Vyasabharatam, Panchavadi and other works. This include four novels, a short story anthropology, a book of poetry and his reminiscences of Kumaran Asan.

Social activities 
Kunhiraman was a close associate of Narayana Guru and an active participant in the intellectual and social activities of Sivagiri Mutt. He was one of the leaders of the Vaikom Satyagraha, a social protest against untouchability, centred around the Shiva temple at Vaikom during 1924–25. He continued to be a part of the agitation which resulted in the Temple Entry Proclamation of 1936. He was a part of the Sree Narayana Dharma Paripalana Yogam and served as its general secretary during 1928–29 and 1931–32. He started a school for low caste Hindus at Vellamanal, Mayyanad, Quilon and became its headmaster. He was also a member of the Sree Moolam Popular Assembly.

Honours 
C. V. Kunhiraman Foundation, an eponymous organization which had O. N. V. Kurup as the founder chairman, have instituted an annual award, C. V. Kunhiraman Literary Award, to recognize excellence in Malayalam literature and M. Sukumaran, the writer, and Sugathakumari, the noted poet, feature among the recipients of the award which carries a purse of  10,001, a citation and a statuette designed by noted artists, B. D. Dathan.

Bibliography 

 Oru Noottandinu Munpu (short stories)
 Shree karthikodayam (poetry)
 Panchavadi (novel)
 Ragaparinamam (novel)
 Sreekovil (novel)
 Somanathan (novel)
 Njan (memoirs)
 Asan Smaranakal (biography)
 Valmiki Ramayanam (condensed prose)
 Vysabharatham (condensed prose)
 Sree Narayana Smruthi (reminiscences)
 Thiruvithamkoor Ezhava Rashtriya Mahasabha Adhyaksha Prasangam (speech)
 Unniyarcha, Oru Pdanam (essay)
 Chekavar (essay)

See also 

 List of Malayalam-language authors by category
 List of Malayalam-language authors
 Ayyathan Gopalan

See Also (Social reformers of Kerala) 

 Sree Narayana Guru
 Dr. Palpu
 Kumaranasan
 Rao Sahib Dr. Ayyathan Gopalan
 Brahmananda Swami Sivayogi
 Vaghbhatananda
 Mithavaadi Krishnan
 Moorkoth Kumaran

 Ayyankali
 Ayya Vaikundar
 Pandit Karuppan

References

External links
 C.V. Kunhuraman Foundation
 
 

Malayalam-language journalists
1871 births
1949 deaths
Writers from Kollam
Journalists from Kerala
Indian social reformers
19th-century Indian journalists
20th-century Indian journalists
20th-century Indian novelists
20th-century Indian essayists
20th-century Indian short story writers
20th-century Indian poets
Narayana Guru
Activists from Kerala
Politicians from Kollam district